J. Pickering Putnam (April 3, 1847 – February 23, 1917) also known as J.P. Putnam or John Pickering Putnam, was an American architect and designer who "pioneered the concept of the modern apartment building." He designed several buildings in the Back Bay area of Boston, Massachusetts. He earned a number of design patents related to plumbing, ventilation, and the like, such as US Patent No.563,064 (1896), a design for a washbasin.

Brief biography 

Putnam was born as "John Amory Putnam" in Boston in 1847, to John Pickering Putnam (1813-1867) and Harriet Upham (1820-1905). He was one of 4 children; his siblings were Mary Upham Putnam (1843-1920); Harriet Putnam (b. 1845); and Sarah Gooll Putnam (1851-1912), a painter.

Putnam graduated from the Boston Latin School, and from Harvard College in 1868. He then trained at the École des Beaux-Arts, Paris, in 1869, and the Royal Academy of Architecture, Berlin, 1870-1872. "The war interrupted his studies. Leaving Paris for Berlin, he was twice arrested as a Prussian spy, while sketching in the streets."

On returning to the US in 1872 he began practicing architecture and was associated professionally with George Thomas Tilden. In 1885 Putnam married Grace Cornelia Stevens; they had 2 children: Grace Elizabeth Putnam (b. 1887) and John Pickering Putnam, Jr. (b. 1892). He was a member of the Boston Society of Architects; St. Botolph Club; Portfolio Club of Boston; and The Cold Cut Club of Boston.

Selected designs 

 1872 — George S. Draper house, Hopedale, Massachusetts (demolished) 
 1872 — Cottage, Nahant, Massachusetts (Remodel, with George T. Tilden)
 1875 — House, 63 Marlborough Street, Boston, Massachusetts
 1876 — Hotel Cluny, 545-547 Boylston Street, Boston, Massachusetts (demolished).
 1877 — Manhattan Beach Hotel, Coney Island, New York
 1878 — House, 277 Dartmouth Street, Boston, Massachusetts
 1878 — House, 167 Marlborough Street, Boston, Massachusetts
 1881 — House, 195 Commonwealth Avenue, Boston, Massachusetts
 1884 — House, 399 Marlborough Street, Boston, Massachusetts
 1890 — Charlesgate Hotel, 535 Beacon Street, Boston, Massachusetts
 1891 — Langmaid Terrace, 359-365 Broadway, Somerville, Massachusetts
 1894 — Haddon Hall, 29 Commonwealth Avenue, Boston, Massachusetts
 1896 — Commonwealth Hotel, Boston, Massachusetts

Further reading

Works by Putnam 
 The metric system of weights and measures. 1877.
 The open fire-place in all ages. 1880.
 Improved Plumbing Appliances. 1887
 Architecture under nationalism. 1890.
 The outlook for the artisan and his art. 1899. “The author shows how the change, from the profit system to Nationalism, will relieve the artisan from anxiety and enable him to put art into his daily work to an extent that the world has never yet seen.”
 Plumbing and household sanitation. 1911.

About Putnam 
 Our plumbing laws; Views of an Expert Upon the Sanitary Requirements of Dwelling Houses. Boston Daily Globe Jan 3, 1885. p. 6.
 Work for the unemployed; Cooperative Association to Hold Mass Meeting. Several Prominent Men to Speak in Faneuil Hall Tomorrow Night. Rev Henry Vrooman, the President, Explains the Object of the Organization. Boston Daily Globe. Dec 3, 1900. p. 10.
 Deborah Fulton Rau. John Pickering Putnam (1847-1917), Visionary in Boston: A Systematic Approach to Apartment House Design. Architectura 22 (1992).

References

External links 

 WorldCat. Putnam, J. Pickering (John Pickering) 1847-1917
 Open Library. Works by J. Pickering Putnam
 Flickr. Charlesgate East

Image gallery 

Architects from Boston
1847 births
1917 deaths
Harvard College alumni
Boston Latin School alumni
Back Bay, Boston
19th century in Boston